Events in the year 2023 in Liberia.

Incumbents 

 President: George Weah
 Vice President: Jewel Taylor
 Chief Justice: Sie-A-Nyene Yuoh

Events

Scheduled 

 2023 Liberian general election

Sports 

 2023 Africa Cup of Nations qualification

See also 

COVID-19 pandemic in Africa
Foreign relations of Liberia

References 

 
2020s in Liberia
Years of the 21st century in Liberia
Liberia
Liberia